Carampangue is a small town in Biobío Region, Chile.  The town is approximately 50 kilometers south of the regional capital, Concepción, and a borders the towns of Arauco and Ramadillas.  
Carampangue is split by a highway, with the two parts respectively referred to by residents as Carampangue Viejo (old Carampangue) and Carampangue Nuevo (New Carampangue). This division is not legal or administrative – it just makes giving directions easier.

The name Carampangue is Mapudungun for green Nalca. Nalca is a fern like plant that grows in the area and is commonly eaten like celery with salt.

The lumber industry is the primary economic backbone of the region. Celulosa Arauco operates outside of the town and is the single largest employer in the area.

Including the surrounding communities of Conumo, La Meseta, Chillancito and Pichilo, the population of Carampangue is 6000.

See also
 List of towns in Chile

External links
Municipalidad de Arauco 

Populated places in Arauco Province